List of Batman episodes may refer to:
List of Batman (TV series) episodes
List of Batman: The Animated Series episodes
List of The Batman episodes